Manchu is an Indian surname. People with this surname include:
Manchu Bhaktavatsalam popularly known as Mohan Babu is a Telugu film actor, producer and politician.
Manoj Manchu, Indian actor
Lakshmi Manchu, Indian actress
Vishnu Manchu, Indian actor